Phillip John Sydney Alley (born 26 July 1970 in Orange, New South Wales) is an Australian former cricket player.

Alley played 31 First class cricket and 8 List A matches for New South Wales and South Australia.

See also
 List of New South Wales representative cricketers
 List of South Australian representative cricketers

References

Living people
1970 births
Australian cricketers
South Australia cricketers
New South Wales cricketers
People from Orange, New South Wales
Cricketers from New South Wales